Edward Urban Kmiec (June 4, 1936 – July 11, 2020) was an American prelate of the Roman Catholic Church.  He served as the 13th bishop of the Diocese of Buffalo in New York from 2004 to 2012. 

Kmiec previously served as an auxiliary bishop for the Diocese of Trenton from 1982 to 1992 and as bishop of the Diocese of Nashville in Tennessee from 1992 to 2004

Biography
Edward Kmiec was born in Trenton, New Jersey, on June 4, 1936.  At age 25, Kmiec was ordained a priest for the Diocese of Trenton by Archbishop Martin O’Connor in Rome on December 20, 1961.

Auxiliary Bishop of Trenton 

Pope John Paul II appointed Kmiec on August 26, 1982, as an auxiliary bishop of the Diocese of Trenton and Titular Bishop of Simidicca.  He was consecrated on November 3, 1982 by Bishop John C. Reiss.

Bishop of Nashville

John Paul II appointed Kmiec as bishop of the Diocese of Nashville on October 13, 1992; he was installed on December 3, 1992.

Bishop of Buffalo, New York
On August 12, 2004, Kmiec was appointed by John Paul II as bishop of the Diocese of Buffalo.  He was installed on October 28, 2004. In 2007, Kmiec announced that the diocese had a balanced budget, after spending cuts reduced a $2.1 million deficit from the previous year.

In August 2009, the Buffalo News reported the removal of Monsignor Fred R. Voorhes, as Administrator of St. Teresa's Parish in South Buffalo and the subsequent dismissal of Marc J. Pasquale, as business administrator and director of religious education at St. Teresa's. Parishioners expressed in interviews their discontent with these removals. Pasquale had gone to the Erie County District Attorney's Office prior to his dismissal to raise concerns about questionable financial practices. 

Kmiec was heavily criticized for downsizing the diocese from 274 parishes and missions in 2005 to 170 in 2011. He also oversaw the closures of 25 elementary schools. The Diocese under Kmiec ordained only 18 priests from 2004-11.

Retirement and legacy 
On May 29, 2012, Pope Benedict XVI accepted Kmiec's resignation as bishop of the Diocese of Buffalo. Bishop Richard Malone from the Diocese of Portland in Maine replaced him.

Edward Kmiec died in Buffalo on July 11, 2020, at age 84.

See also

 Catholic Church hierarchy
 Catholic Church in the United States
 Historical list of the Catholic bishops of the United States
 List of Catholic bishops of the United States
 Lists of patriarchs, archbishops, and bishops

References

External links
 Roman Catholic Diocese of Buffalo Official Site
 Most Rev. Edward U. Kmiec

Episcopal succession

 

1936 births
2020 deaths
American people of Polish descent
20th-century Roman Catholic bishops in the United States
21st-century Roman Catholic bishops in the United States
People from Trenton, New Jersey
Roman Catholic bishops of Buffalo
Roman Catholic Diocese of Trenton
Religious leaders from New York (state)
Religious leaders from New Jersey
Roman Catholic bishops of Nashville
Knights of the Holy Sepulchre
Catholics from New Jersey